Mohorovičić is a lunar impact crater that is located on the far side of the Moon. It lies to the southwest of the larger crater Doppler and the huge walled plain Korolev. To the southwest of Mohorovičić is a small lunar mare that has been named Lacus Oblivionis.  Due south of it is an unnamed mountain that formed during the impact that created the South Pole-Aitken Basin.

This is a circular crater that has undergone some wear from subsequent impacts. The satellite crater Mohorovičić Z lies on the northern interior floor, adjacent to the northern inner wall and rim. A small, cup-shaped crater is intruding into the western rim.

Satellite craters
By convention these features are identified on lunar maps by placing the letter on the side of the crater midpoint that is closest to Mohorovičić.

References

 
 
 
 
 
 
 
 
 
 
 
 

Impact craters on the Moon